Erland Josephson (15 June 1923 – 25 February 2012) was a Swedish actor and author. He was best known by international audiences for his work in films directed by Ingmar Bergman, Andrei Tarkovsky and Theodoros Angelopoulos.

Life and career
Josephson was born on the island of Kungsholmen, in Stockholm, Sweden, as the son of Maud Ellen Gabrielle (née Boheman) and Gunnar August Josephson, a bookseller of Jewish descent, in 1923. His uncle (mother's brother) was diplomat Erik Boheman, and his maternal great-grandfather was entomologist Carl Henrik Boheman.

Josephson was the leader of the Royal Dramatic Theatre in Stockholm from 1966 to 1975. He also published novels, short stories, poetry and drama, and was the director of several films. In 1980, he directed and starred in the film Marmalade Revolution, which was entered into the 30th Berlin International Film Festival. In 1986, he starred in The Sacrifice and won the award for Best Actor at the 22nd Guldbagge Awards.

He was the Swedish voice of the Narrator in Disney's Beauty and the Beast.

Selected filmography

 It Rains on Our Love (1946, directed by Ingmar Bergman) as Clerk at the vicar's office (uncredited)
 Eva (1948, directed by Gustaf Molander) as Karl, Josef's Brother (uncredited)
 To Joy (1950, directed by Ingmar Bergman) as Bertil (uncredited)
 Stage Entrance (1956, directed by Bengt Ekerot) as Bergkvist, director / Narrator
 Som man bäddar... (1957, directed by Börje Larsson) as Erik, doctor
 Brink of Life (1958, directed by Ingmar Bergman) as Anders Ellius
 The Magician (1958, directed by Ingmar Bergman) as Consul Egerman
 Hour of the Wolf (1968, directed by Ingmar Bergman) as Baron von Merkens
 The Girls (1968, directed by Mai Zetterling) as Carl
 Eva - den utstötta (1969, directed by Torgny Wickman)
 The Passion of Anna (1969, directed by Ingmar Bergman) as Elis Vergérus / Himself
 Cries and Whispers (1972, directed by Ingmar Bergman) as David
 Scenes from a Marriage (1974, directed by Ingmar Bergman) as Johan
 The Magic Flute (1975, TV Movie, directed by Ingmar Bergman) as Man in Audience (uncredited)
 Monismanien 1995 (1975, directed by Kenne Fant) as Teacher
 Face to Face (1976, directed by Ingmar Bergman) as Dr. Tomas Jacobi
 I Am Afraid (1977, directed by Damiano Damiani) as Judge Cancedda
 Games of Love and Loneliness (1977, directed by Anja Breien) as Doncker
 Beyond Good and Evil (1977, directed by Liliana Cavani) as Friedrich Nietzsche
 En och en (1978, directed by  Erland Josephson) as Uncle Dan
 Autumn Sonata (1978, directed by Ingmar Bergman) as Josef
 The First Polka (1979, directed by Klaus Emmerich) as Leo Maria Piontek
 To Forget Venice (1979, directed by Franco Brusati) as Nicky
 Marmalade Revolution (1980, directed by himself) as Karl Henrik Eller
 Kärleken (1980, directed by Theodor Kallifatides) as Andreas
 The Melody Haunts My Memory (1981, directed by Rajko Grlić) as Rudolf
 Peacetime in Paris (1981, directed by Predrag Golubović)
 Montenegro (1981, directed by Dušan Makavejev) as Martin Jordan
 Variola Vera (1982, directed by Goran Marković) as Dr. Dragutin Kenigsmark
 Fanny and Alexander (1982, directed by Ingmar Bergman) as Isak Jacobi - Jacobis hus
 Eva (1983, directed by Franci Slak) as Oce
 Nostalghia (1983, directed by Andrei Tarkovsky) as Domenico
 The House of the Yellow Carpet (1983, directed by Carlo Lizzani) as The Professor
 Bella Donna (1983, directed by Peter Keglevic) as Max
 After the Rehearsal (1984, TV Movie, directed by Ingmar Bergman) as Henrik Vogler (older)
 Angelas krig (1984, directed by Eija-Elina Bergholm) as Anton Goldberg
 Bakom jalusin (1984, directed by Stig Bjorkman) as Daniel Brenner
 Dirty Story (1984, directed by Jörn Donner) as Gabriel Berggren
 De flyvende djævle (1985, directed by Anders Refn) as Oscar Seidenbaum
 Il giocatore invisibile (1985, directed by Sergio Genni)
 Amorosa (1986, directed by Mai Zetterling) as David Sprengel
 Saving Grace (1986, directed by Robert M. Young) as Monsignor Francesco Ghezzi
 The Sacrifice (1986, directed by Andrei Tarkovsky) as Alexander
 L'ultima mazurka (1986, directed by Gianfranco Bettetini) as Serra
 The Malady of Love (1986, directed by Giorgio Treves) as Robert's Father
 Il giorno prima (1987, directed by Giuliano Montaldo) as Swanson
 The Unbearable Lightness of Being (1988, directed by Philip Kaufman) as The Ambassador
 Le testament d'un poète juif assassiné (1988, directed by Frank Cassenti) as Zupanev
 Hanussen (1988, directed by István Szabó) as Dr. Bettelheim
 Migrations (1989, directed by Aleksandar Petrović) as Episkop
 The Legendary Life of Ernest Hemingway (1989, directed by José María Sánchez) as Clarence Hemingway
 The Dark Sun (1990, directed by Damiano Damiani) as Attorney Belmonte
 Good Evening, Mr. Wallenberg (1990, directed by Kjell Grede) as Rabbinen
 The Wicked (1991, directed by Carlo Lizzani) as Prof. Brokner
 Prospero's Books (1991, directed by Peter Greenaway) as Gonzalo
 Meeting Venus (1991, directed by István Szabó) as Jorge Picabia
 The Ox (1991, directed by Sven Nykvist) as Sigvard Silver
 Den ofrivillige golfaren (1991, directed by Lasse Åberg) as Kritikern
 Holozän (1992, directed by Heinz Bütler, Manfred Eicher) as Geiser
 Sofie (1992, directed by Liv Ullmann) as Sofie's Father
 Dreamplay (1994, directed by Unni Straume) as Blind Man
 Zabraneniat plod (1994, directed by Unni Straume) as Hazainat
 C'è Kim Novak al telefono (1994, directed by Riki Roseo)
 Ulysses' Gaze (1995, directed by Theo Angelopoulos) as Library Curator
 Pakten (1995, directed by Leidulv Risan) as August Lind
 Kristin Lavransdatter (1995, directed by Liv Ullmann) as Broder Edvin
 In the Presence of a Clown (1997, TV Movie, directed by Ingmar Bergman) as Osvald Vogler
 Magnetisøren's femte vinter (1999, directed by Morten Henriksen) as Hr. Hofverberg
 Faithless (2000, directed by Liv Ullmann) as Bergman
 Now (2003, Short, directed by Simon Staho) as Jakob (old)
 The Good Pope: Pope John XXIII (2003, TV Movie, directed by Ricky Tognazzi) as Franz Von Papen
 Saraband (2003, TV Movie, directed by Ingmar Bergman) as Johan
 Day and Night (2004, directed by Simon Staho) as Berättare (voice)
 Dobro ustimani mrtvaci (2005, directed by Benjamin Filipovic) as Zaim Kundurevic
 Wellkåmm to Verona (2006, directed by Suzanne Osten) as Joseph

Bibliography
 Cirkel (1946)
 Spegeln och en portvakt (1946)
 Spel med bedrövade artister (1947)
 Ensam och fri (1948)
 Lyssnarpost (1949)
 De vuxna barnen (1952)
 Sällskapslek (1956)
 En berättelse om herr Silberstein (1957)
 Kungen ur leken (1960)
 Benjamin : Generalskan (1963)
 Doktor Meyers sista dagar och Kandidat Nilssons första natt (1964)
 Loppans kvällsvard (1986)
 Konrad på teatern (1987)
 Kameleonterna (1987)
 Färgen : den borgerliga kulturens envisa överlevande (1988)
 Peter åker traktor (1989)
 Rollen : antecknat på turné med Körsbärsträdgården 24/2 – 15/5 1989 (1989)
 Sanningslekar (1990)
 Konrad på gubbdagis : en bilderbok för vuxna (1991)
 Föreställningar (1991)
 Konrad tar semester : en bilderbok för omogna (1993)
 Självporträtt : en egocentrisk dialog (1993)
 Sanningslekar (1994)
 Gubbröra (1994)
 Vita sanningar (1995)
 Svarslös (1996)
 Stockholms Själ (1999)
 Kunskapens scen : ett urval texter (2007)
 Reskamrater : berättelser i all korthet (2009)
 En natt i den svenska sommaren (2011)

References

External links

 

1923 births
2012 deaths
Deaths from Parkinson's disease
Swedish people of Jewish descent
Jewish male actors
Litteris et Artibus recipients
Male actors from Stockholm
Swedish Jews
Swedish male film actors
Swedish film directors
Eugene O'Neill Award winners
20th-century Swedish male actors
21st-century Swedish male actors
Best Actor Guldbagge Award winners
Neurological disease deaths in Sweden